The men's team foil competition at the 2006 Asian Games in Doha was held on 12 December at the Al-Arabi Indoor Hall.

Schedule
All times are Arabia Standard Time (UTC+03:00)

Seeding
The teams were seeded taking into account the results achieved by competitors representing each team in the individual event.

Results

Final standing

References
Seeding

External links
Official website

Men Foil